The 2002 season was the 11th full year of competitive football in the Baltic country as an independent nation. The Estonia national football team played a total number of eleven matches in 2002, and did not qualify for the 2002 FIFA World Cup in Japan and South Korea.

Saudi Arabia vs Estonia

Estonia vs Russia

Poland vs Estonia

San Marino vs Estonia

Estonia vs Azerbaijan

Kazakhstan vs Estonia

Estonia vs Moldova

Croatia vs Estonia

Estonia vs New Zealand

Estonia vs Belgium

Estonia vs Iceland

Notes

References
 RSSSF detailed results
 RSSSF detailed results

2002
2002 national football team results
National